Maruchi Fresno (14 February 1916 – 19 July 2003) was a Spanish film actress. Fresno appeared in around sixty films and television series during her long career. In 1947 she played the role of Isabel of Aragon in the historical film The Holy Queen.

Partial filmography

 El agua en el suelo (1934) - Marucha Vilaredo
 Broken Lives (1935) - Irene
 Leyenda rota (1940) - Mari-Luz
 La última falla (1940) - Enriqueta
 El famoso Carballeira (1940)
 Tierra y cielo (1941) - Clara
 Una conquista difícil (1941)
 ¡¡Campeones!! (1943) - Himself (uncredited)
 Mi adorable secretaria (1943) - Marta
 Altar mayor (1944) - Teresa
 The Prodigal Woman (1946) - María
 Mar abierto (1946) - Carmiña
 The Holy Queen (1947) - Isabel of Aragón
 Serenata española (1947) - Laura Salcedo
 Noche sin cielo (1947) - Rosa
 The Captain from Loyola (1949) - Reina Juana
 Dora la espía (1950)
 The Vila Family (1950) - Carmen
 Historia de una escalera (1950) - Trini
 Criminal Brigade (1950) - Isabel - esposa del Inspector Basilio
 Verónica (1950)
 Reckless (1951) - Elena
 Catalina de Inglaterra (1951) - Catalina de Aragón
 La laguna negra (1952) - Candela
 Flight 971 (1953) - Carmen Valverde de Galván
 Pasaporte para un ángel (Órdenes secretas) (1954)
 La lupa (1955) - María
 The Night Heaven Fell (1958) - Conchita
 El redentor (1959) - Virgin Mary
 Solomon and Sheba (1959) - Bathsheba
 El camino (1963) - La Guindilla menor
 Diálogos de la paz (1965) - Mujer histérica
 Great Leaders of the Bible (1965) - Moglie di Gedeone / Wife of Gideon
 The Desperate Ones (1967)
 A Bullet for Rommel (1969) - Mrs. Rommel
 Algo amargo en la boca (1969) - Aurelia
 Casi jugando (1969)
 The Rebellious Novice (1971)
 The Regent's Wife (1974) - Marquesa
 La trastienda (1975) - Sagrario
 Laura, del cielo llega la noche (1987)
 Continuum (1994) - (voice)
 Pecata minuta (1998) - Sor Aurora (final film role)

References

Bibliography 
 Bentley, Bernard. A Companion to Spanish Cinema. Boydell & Brewer 2008.

External links 
 

1916 births
2003 deaths
Spanish film actresses
20th-century Spanish actresses
People from Madrid